Miroslav Sovič (born 9 March 1970 in Košice) is a former Slovak footballer who played for Lokomotíva Košice, 1. FC Košice, FC Nitra, appearing in 5 league matches. Sparta Praha and he ended his career at MFK Košice. Sovič played for Slovakia 12 matches and scored one goal. He is currently head coach of 3. liga club FK Košice.

References

External links

1970 births
Living people
Slovak footballers
Slovakia international footballers
FK Jablonec players
AC Sparta Prague players
FK Viktoria Žižkov players
FC VSS Košice players
FC Nitra players
Slovak Super Liga players
Sportspeople from Košice
Association football midfielders